Campbell Commercial Historic District is a national historic district located at Campbell, Dunklin County, Missouri. The district encompasses 19 contributing buildings in the central business district of Campbell. The district developed between about 1883 and 1930, and includes representative examples of Colonial Revival style architecture.  Notable buildings include the Rice Hardware Company (c. 1910), Cotton Belt Hotel (c. 1900), City Hall (1906), Boyd's Department Store (c. 1909), and Pol-Mac Hotel.

It was listed on the National Register of Historic Places in 1991.

References

Historic districts on the National Register of Historic Places in Missouri
Colonial Revival architecture in Missouri
Buildings and structures in Dunklin County, Missouri
National Register of Historic Places in Dunklin County, Missouri